King Carl may refer to:

 King Carl XVI Gustaf of Sweden (born 1946), Knight of the Garter
 Carl Peterson (born 1943), nicknamed "King Carl" by sportswriter Jason Whitlock, general manager of the Kansas City Chiefs

See also
 Carl King (disambiguation)